Nacobbus aberrans is a plant pathogenic nematode.

See also 
 List of beet diseases
 List of Capsicum diseases
 List of lettuce diseases

References

External links 
 Nemaplex, University of California - Nacobbus aberrans

Tylenchida
Lettuce diseases
Vegetable diseases
Agricultural pest nematodes